SIRCA is a provider of online services to support finance and other data-intensive research at universities, Government and financial market participants world-wide.

History
SIRCA was incorporated in 1997 as a not-for-profit company to host and manage share price data from the Australian Securities Exchange (ASX) for a small group of collaborating Australian universities.

In its early years, SIRCA collaborated with the ASX and other research partners on a number of landmark studies including:  
 ASIC review of the research on the past performance of managed funds [2002] 
 The ASX-SIRCA Benchmarking Study [2003]
 The Importance of Market Integrity [2004] 
 Identity Fraud in Australia [2003] A report for financial intelligence agency AUSTRAC which found it to be $1.1Bn problem.

Today, SIRCA serves over 50 universities including 37 member universities in Australia and New Zealand and over 20 from North America, Europe and Asia.

Services

SIRCA in partnership with the Australian Financial Markets Association produces the Australian Financial Markets Report (AFMR) - an annual report with comprehensive coverage and statistics on all Australia's financial markets including equities, futures, bonds and over-the-counter securities. In 2012, these markets collectively turned over collectively turned over more than $125 trillion in 2011-12.

SIRCA technology underpins the market leading Thomson Reuters Tick History database. This is used by most leading financial institutions around the world as a source of historical tick and end of day data for a variety of functions, including the back testing of algorithms to support automated trading strategies, and for a range of risk and compliance related tasks.

Governance
SIRCA is a registered as a not-for-profit company limited by guarantee with the Australian company regulator Australian Securities & Investments Commission (ASIC). SIRCA’s governance is overseen by a Board of Directors, and Executive.

See also
  Australian Securities Exchange (ASX)
 Thomson Reuters
 Reserve Bank of Australia
 Australian Transaction Reports and Analysis Centre

References

External links
Official SIRCA Website
 Technology Spectator, "A smarter approach to innovation" 28 Aug 2012

Financial services companies of Australia
Non-profit organisations based in New South Wales
E-Science
Information science
Organizations established in 1997
Organisations based in Sydney